The 1944 Argentine Primera División was the 53rd season of top-flight football in Argentina. The season began on April 16 and ended on November 26.

Boca Juniors won the championship, achieving its 12th league title. Vélez Sársfield returned after promoting last year while Banfield was relegated.

League standings

References

Argentine Primera División seasons
Argentine Primera Division
Primera Division